The H.J. Doughtery House is a historic house on the west side of Arkansas Highway 14 in Marcella, Arkansas.  Set relatively close to the road, it is a single-story wood frame dogtrot house, with a gable roof and a shed-roofed front porch extending across the east-facing front facade.  It is clad in weatherboard and rests on stone piers.  A fieldstone chimney rises at the northern end.  Built about 1905, this house shows the evolution of the dogtrot, by the regular enclosure of its central breezeway, to something more closely resembling a center-hall plan house.

The house was listed on the National Register of Historic Places in 1985.

See also
National Register of Historic Places listings in Stone County, Arkansas

References

Houses on the National Register of Historic Places in Arkansas
Houses completed in 1905
Houses in Stone County, Arkansas
National Register of Historic Places in Stone County, Arkansas
1905 establishments in Arkansas